Shelley Gautier (born 31 October 1968) is a Canadian multi-medalist in para-cycling. 
At the UCI Para-cycling Road World Championships from 2010 to 2022, Gautier has won 16 golds as part of her 19 medals. At the Parapan American Games, Gautier won a silver at the mixed road time trial event held at the 2011 Parapan American Games and 2015 Parapan American Games. As a Paralympic competitor, Gautier won a bronze at the 2016 Summer Paralympics in the women's time trial event. Apart from para-cycling, Gautier competed in disabled sailing. Gautier was inducted into the Niagara Falls Sports Wall of Fame in 2003 and nominated for the Laureus World Sports Award for Sportsperson of the Year with a Disability in 2015.

Early life and education
Gautier was born on 31 October 1968 in Niagara Falls, Ontario. She went to the University of Western Ontario for an honours degree in physical education before graduating from the University of Toronto with a physical therapy degree.

Career
Gautier began her sports career while in university as a college athlete. After a head injury and coma in 2001, Gautier was diagnosed with hemiparesis on the right side of her body. After her injury, Gautier started competing in disabled sailing before moving on towards para-cycling. During her disabled sailing career, Gautier won the Silver Fleet event at the 2006 Mobility Cup and was the president of the Disabled Sailing Association of Ontario from 2006 to 2007.

In para-cycling, Gautier won repeat golds in the time trial and road race events at the UCI Para-cycling Road World Championships from 2010 to 2015. Gautier continued to win gold at the road race and time trial events at the 2017 UCI Para-cycling Road World Championships and 2018 UCI Para-cycling Road World Championships. During the 2019 UCI Para-cycling Road World Championships, Gautier won silver in the road race and bronze in the time trial. At the 2021 UCI Para-cycling Road World Championships, Gautier won gold in the road race and time trial events. For the 2022 UCI Para-cycling Road World Championships, Gautier won bronze in the time trial and was last in the road race.

Outside of UCI, Gautier won a silver at the 2011 Parapan American Games and 2015 Parapan American Games in the mixed time trial events. After not medalling at the 2012 Summer Paralympics, Gautier received a bronze medal in the women's time trial event at the 2016 Summer Paralympics. Gautier did not win a medal at her events during the 2020 Summer Paralympics. Apart from competitions, the Shelley Gautier Para-Sport Foundation was created by Gautier in the mid-2010s.

Awards and honours
In 2003, Gautier was inducted into the Niagara Falls Sports Wall of Fame as a member of the A. N. Myer Secondary School's soccer team. Gautier was nominated for the Laureus World Sports Award for Sportsperson of the Year with a Disability in 2015 and lost to Tatyana McFadden.

References

External links
 
 

1968 births
Canadian female cyclists
Cyclists at the 2012 Summer Paralympics
Cyclists at the 2016 Summer Paralympics
Living people
Paralympic cyclists of Canada
Paralympic bronze medalists for Canada
Sportspeople from Niagara Falls, Ontario
Medalists at the 2016 Summer Paralympics
Paralympic medalists in cycling
Medalists at the 2011 Parapan American Games
Medalists at the 2015 Parapan American Games
20th-century Canadian women
21st-century Canadian women